"Without You" is a song by English singer John Newman and Scottish singer Nina Nesbitt. The song was released as a digital download on 30 August 2019 by Island Records as the lead single from Newman's EP A.N.i.M.A.L. The song peaked at number 21 on Scottish Singles Chart.

Background
Talking about the collaboration, Nesbitt said, "I'm very excited to be on John’s new single 'Without You'. He's been so fun to work with and I've been a fan of his music for a long time." Newman said, "I have also been a fan of Nina and always loved working with her, it was an easy decision to get her on this stonker! We're glad it was an easy decision as we love the outcome of this collaboration!"

Track listing

Personnel
Credits adapted from Tidal.
 John Newman – producer, co-producer, vocals
 Ritual – producer, co-producer
 Adam Argyle – composer, lyricist
 Andrew Jackson – composer, lyricist
 Cleo Tighe – composer, lyricist
 John Newman – composer, lyricist, associated performer
 Nina Nesbitt – composer, lyricist, associated performer, vocals
 Tommy Baxter – composer, lyricist, associated performer, bass, guitar, keyboards
 Adam Midgley – associated performer, drum programming
 Nina Bergqvist – associated performer, background vocalist
 Stuart Hawkes – mastering engineer, studio personnel
 Emre Ramazanoglu – mixer, studio personnel

Charts

Release history

References

2019 singles
2019 songs
Island Records singles
John Newman (singer) songs
Songs written by Cleo Tighe
Songs written by Adam Argyle
Songs written by John Newman (singer)